Bruce Patterson (born 29 January 1965 in Ayr) was a Scottish cricketer. He took his first two wickets in a competition in June 2004 against Holland. He participated in three One-day internationals in May 1999 and played List A cricket from 1988 to 2002. He also participated in the 2001 ICC Trophy.

He hit Damien Fleming for 4 off the first ball of the match against Australia in 1999.

He has now retired from all forms of cricket and runs an estate agency in Ayr.

References

1965 births
Living people
Scottish cricketers
Scotland One Day International cricketers
Cricketers at the 1998 Commonwealth Games
Commonwealth Games competitors for Scotland
Sportspeople from Ayr